Tonje Brenna (born 21 October 1987) is a Norwegian politician currently serving as the Minister of Education since 2021. A member of the Labour Party, she previously served as the chairwoman of the Viken county cabinet from 2020 to 2021, and is currently a deputy member in the Storting for Akershus since 2017.

Personal life
Brenna was formerly in a relationship with fellow party member Martin Henriksen.

She is currently together with Vetle Larsen, with whom she has two sons. They also have a Labrador retriever named Jussi.

Career

Youth league
Brenna was the General Secretary of the Workers' Youth League from 2010 to 2012. In her position, she was present during the time of the 2011 Norway attacks on the island of Utøya, and responsible for the camp there. She was also responsible for taking care of loved ones, victims and survivors during the aftermath of the attack.

Local politics
Brenna was a member of the county council of Akershus from 2007 to 2019, and from 2020 a member of the county council of Viken. She chaired the county cabinet of Viken from 2020 to 2021.

Party politics
In the wake of Hadia Tajik's resignation in March 2022, Brenna was floated as a possible successor, and was so again in December the same year. In February 2023, both Troms and Akershus county chapters chose her as their preferred candidate for the national party's deputy leader. Brenna thanked for the confidence and said that she was willing to take on the role if that's the party wish for at the party conference in May. She officially announced her candidacy on 1 March.

Parliament
She was a political advisor at the Office of the Prime Minister from 2012 to 2013. During this time, the 22 July commission was handed over. She was also a political advisor to minister of justice Grete Faremo from May to October 2013. She was elected deputy representative to the Storting from the constituency of Akershus for the periods 2017–2021 and 2021–2025, for the Labour Party.

In 2021 she published a book related to the 2011 Utøya shootings, 22. juli – og alle dagene etterpå.

Minister of Education
On 14 October 2021, she was appointed minister of education in Støre's Cabinet.

Brenna expressed that the Solberg Cabinet's early re-instalment  of school absence rules were wrong. She promised to be back with a better solution as soon as possible, saying that rules had to be understandable for both teachers and students and to be experienced as sensible.

Following demands for the absence limit in upper secondary schools to be relaxed, Brenna announced that this change would become effective on 5 November and last throughout the school term. The primary cause for the demand had been that students shouldn't be given absence remarks due to having COVID-19 and have the need to go into quarantine. She said she understood the dilemma for students, and noted that they would have to get an approved leave of absence, to for example go to a doctor's appointment or similar.

On 17 November, Brenna ordered the Norwegian Directorate for Education and Training to halt the case process of private schools. Brenna said that the government wanted to strengthen public schools and wanted to stop the previous government's privatisation of schools. The Conservative Party's Margret Hagerup called it "a dark day" for Norwegian students, and that the government had focused on "ideology and structure" instead of "quality and diversity".

In early December, Brenna expressed that private schools earned to much from students taking private exams. She stressed that upper secondary schools should advise students better and to inform them of their choices when it comes to higher education. She did however add that private education isn't necessarily bad, and serves as "a safety valve" for those who don't have other options.

On 13 December, at a government press conference with prime minister Jonas Gahr Støre and health minister Ingvild Kjerkol, it was announced that kindergartens, primary and lower secondary schools would be adjusted to yellow tier, while upper secondary schools to red. Brenna announced that municipalities should prioritise vaccinating kindergarten and school staff once the vaccination of a third vaccine dose  commences.

Following criticism of the government's measure to give exceptions to teachers and kindergarten staff in regards to quarantine, Brenna defended the decision, citing it to be crucial for children's ability to learn. She stated: "I understand the criticism, but I am keen to take the necessary steps to keep kindergartens and schools as open as possible.  It is crucial for children and young people's learning and everyday life, but also for parents, society and working life".

On 11 February 2022, Brenna announced that exams for the 2021-22 school year would be cancelled, citing the pandemic. She did however stress that it wasn't an indication for students to take it easy, and encouraged them to work hard going forward.

On 2 April, she announced that changes would be made to the test system in Norwegian schools. Brenna clarified that tests still would be utilised, but needs to be viewed with "fresh eyes", in addition to there being less tests. She stated: "Information about how students are doing is only useful if it is used in a good way. We have not sat down and looked holistically at how the tests work, and how we use them in development work, for many years".

At a press conference on 29 April, the government announced that temporary changes to laws in order to include Ukrainian refugees. In regards to her field of responsibility, Brenna talked about education offers and learning to/for Ukrainian children. This included a government proposal about learning and training which would expand the period from one to three months that was originally in the law. She stated: "This will make it possible for the municipalities to receive several refugees at once. The municipalities still have a duty to provide an offer as soon as possible. With this proposal, the municipalities will have more time to be able to acquire premises and employees and put in place a full-fledged training offer".

On 6 June, Brenna and culture minister Anette Trettebergstuen announced a plan to have more men work within the health sector, in collaboration with the University of Tromsø, to launch a pilot project. The aim for the pilot project is to encourage boys to apply for an education within the health service. Brenna stated: "The best mechanic can be a woman.  The best nurse can be a man.  The important thing is to find the profession that suits you best. Then we want everyone to choose regardless of which gender norms are associated with the professions. That's freedom".

On 15 August, Brenna announced that the government would be starting work on establishing a National centre for vocational subjects, stating: "We know that Norway will need 90,000 skilled workers by 2035. We must ensure that vocational training is good and relevant, so that more people choose vocational subjects and that they complete with a certificate. A national center for vocational subjects can be a part of achieving these goals". Regarding whose responsibility the centre would fall under, she said: "What kind of tasks such a center should have and where it should be located must be investigated thoroughly. But the aim is that the center should contribute to developing long-term and targeted high-quality vocational and vocational training, and that it can be a point of contact for regional, national and international players in vocational and vocational training".

On 29 August, in response to reports of school refusals being reported to the Child Welfare Services, Brenna called for a report into children's absences from school. She stated: "Before the summer, I commissioned the Directorate of Education to assess how we can get better information about absences from school, and whether there is a need to introduce other measures to help students who are absent a lot". She also added that absences would be a part of a Storting message focusing on the well-being and motivation of fifth to tenth graders. Furthermore, the help services for children would also be strengthened and be obligated to work more together for children who need help.

In September, she expressed that changes should be made to the Russ time slot, and expressed concern for exclusions from Russ buses, while also calling for more inclusion and cooperation with counties to make that happen. This came in response to a case where 19 year old Frøy Hoftun Hedemark was excluded from her Russ bus and successfully sued the bus team for breach of contract.

On 30 September, Brenna rejected the idea from the Norwegian Young Conservatives member Nicolai Østeby to cancel autumn break in favour of more time for education in schools following the teacher' strike. She stated that it's up to the municipalities to determine the school schedule, and that the entire school schedule should be utilised.

On 17 October, she responded to a ban against school prayers by a Christian school in Balestrand against its students. The school's decision was also supported by the municipality. She asserted that it was "traditional" to utilise school facilities to different sort of activities. The Christian Democrats praised her response, saying that they understood Brenna to subtly hold the municipality accountable without criticising their assessment. Norway's Christian Student and Youth Association on the other hand weren't surprised by Brenna's response. They argued that the "tradition" to utilise school facilities for different activities, she was referring to, was the exact one which in this case had been broken.

On 30 October, she warned against "joy grades" that were handed out to students during the COVID-19 pandemic, in private upper secondary schools in particular. The sharp increase in grades were also higher then the average given in public schools. Brenna also expressed concerns for grades being handed out in order to draw in more students.

In early December, Brenna announced that an amendment to the Private School Act would be sent out on hearing. The amendment would entail local elected officials getting a say in the establishment of new private schools, something she deemed had been less of before. The opposition parties however opposed the idea, noting that such a function already was in place in the act, and that Brenna seemed to forget about students entirely.

In January 2023, she rejected calls from the opposition to intervene in making sure that counties would ensure that municipalities would follow the law when it comes to registering students who are homeschooled. The calls from the opposition came in the wake of revelations of that the ten largest municipalities in the country lacked control and overview of children who are homeschooled. Brenna argued that the municipalities needed good strategies and routines in order to follow up on the matter. When asked what she would do about the issue, she mentioned that the rules of homeschooling would be an issue touched on in the new Education Act which would be in place by the next school term.

Bibliography

References

1987 births
Living people
Labour Party (Norway) politicians
Akershus politicians
Deputy members of the Storting
Ministers of Education of Norway
Women government ministers of Norway
Women members of the Storting